Jerry Alan Dunn (born January 29, 1946) is an American athlete dubbed "America's Marathon Man" by Jim Murray of the LA Times. His running career began in 1975 and has spanned 45 years, breaking world records along the way  and seeing the creation of nationally acclaimed events.

Early life
Dunn was 18 years old when his father died of a coronary heart attack, courtesy of an unhealthy lifestyle. Dunn attributes this event to be a precursor to what would become a 25-year drinking career and evolution into a high-functioning alcoholic.

At age 29, while working in Sarasota, Dunn answered a challenge by a lifeguard friend to run along the beach.  He did so for a half mile, barefoot, and from that moment he was a running convert.

On Dunn's 37th birthday, he finally admitted to having a problem with alcohol.  "I turned to running as my replacement obsession," Dunn says, "and never stopped moving since then."

Running accolades 
 1981 – Ran the Philadelphia Marathon, Dunn's first sanctioned marathon.
 1989 – Ran a benefit run for Habitat for Humanity titled Across the State in 28.  Dunn ran from the Illinois/Indiana state line to the Indiana/Ohio state line, 50 mi per day for 3 days.

 1991 - Ran a benefit run for Habitat for Humanity titled Shore to Shore in 104.  It consisted of a marathon a day, 6 days a week for 15 weeks, which got him from San Francisco to DC in 104 days.  It took 50,000+ miles of both training and competitive miles.  For his efforts he was rewarded with a personal audience with President Jimmy Carter.

 1993 – Dunn ran 104 marathons in a year, breaking a world record titled 93 in '93.
 1996 – Ran the Boston Marathon course each morning for 25 days prior to the 100th running of the Boston Marathon.
 1997 – Did the LA Marathon for 15 days straight prior to the 15th anniversary of the Los Angeles Marathon.
 1998 – Again, ran 16 days in a row for the LA Marathon before running the race for its 16th anniversary.
 1998 – For 28 days, Dunn did the original circuit for the NY Marathons 29th anniversary before running the marathon the day of. 
 200 in 2000 – Upping the ante, Dunn set out with a goal to run 200 marathons in 2000. His fastest time completed was the HOPS Marathon by Tampa Bay in 4:05:30. While he fell short of his 200 marathon goal, Dunn still completed 186 marathons at age 54.
 2006 – Dunn ran 60 miles on his 60th birthday, raising money for a local middle school.
 2007 – Dunn was awarded the Special Achievement Award from South Dakota's Black Hills, Badlands & Lakes Association for his creation of the Deadwood Mickelson Trail Marathon and Lean Horse Ultra Marathons, bringing national acclaim and visiting athleticism to run the Mickelson Trail of the Black Hills.
 2011 – Dunn ran 65 miles on his 65th birthday.
 2016 – Dunn ran 70K in honor of his 70th birthday on the day of the Lean Horse Ultra Marathon.

Event creation and race directing 
After the 200 in 2000 project's completion, Dunn directed his passion for running into a new arena and brought four events to the Black Hills of South Dakota.

He began in 2002 with the Deadwood Mickelson Trail Marathon.  The entire course is run on the George Mickelson Trail and reviews declare it some of the most beautiful scenery to run in.

Dunn followed this up with the Lean Horse Ultra Marathon, also along the Mickelson Trail, which saw its first race in 2005. 

In 2010, Dunn and his business partner, Emily Wheeler, added Run Crazy Horse to their growing portfolio of events.  Dunn would eventually sell these races to Wheeler, assured they would be in good hands.

The Black Hills 100 Ultra Marathon, created by Ryan Phillips and Chris Stores, two of Dunn's mentees, is the latest event to have his influence.

Philanthropic work 
 1991 – For their 15 Year Anniversary Building campaign, Dunn a benefit run for Habitat for Humanity titled Shore to Shore in 104.  It consisted of a marathon a day, 6 days a week for 15 weeks, would get him from San Francisco to DC in 104 days.  It took 50,000+ miles of both training and competitive miles, that ultimately wound up with a personal audience with President Carter.
 2016 – Dunn raised money for the Special Olympics through his "70 at 70" fundraiser.

Cannabis advocacy 
America's Marathon Man continues to advocate for the legalization of cannabis and how it may positively impact veterans and aging Baby Boomers.  Dunn believes in the potential of medicinal cannabis to help treat conditions such PTSD, arthritis, and more.

Dunn also promotes the use of cannabis for athletes, believing the stigma historically attached to cannabis users is unfounded.  He knows from personal experience that CBD, in particular, is vital in relieving both mental stress and physical pain after training and competitive events.

Appearances 
 "Fitter after 50: Forever Changing Our Beliefs About Aging" by Ed and Mary Mayhew
 "The Messengers" by Malcolm Anderson
Runner’s High. Josiah Hessee

References 

Living people
1946 births

American male long-distance runners